Idiopathic chronic fatigue (ICF), is characterized by unexplained fatigue that lasts at least six consecutive months. It is widely understood to have a profound effect on the lives of patients who experience it.

ICF is a common illness of unknown origin, and remains poorly understood.

Classification
Idiopathic chronic fatigue is classified as a physical medical condition of unknown origin by the World Health Organization.

Diagnosis
ICF is fatigue of unknown origin, persisting or relapsing for a minimum of six consecutive months, and failing to meet the criteria for chronic fatigue syndrome. There are no agreed upon international criteria for idiopathic chronic fatigue, however the CDC's 1994 Idiopathic Chronic Fatigue criteria, known as the Fukuda criteria, are commonly used.

Signs and symptoms
 Clinically evaluated fatigue
 New or definite onset (not lifelong)
 Not resulting from exertion
 Fatigue persists or is relapsing for six consecutive months or longer
 Fails to meet the criteria for chronic fatigue syndrome
 The cause is unknown

Exclusions 
 Fatigue which begins within 2 years of a substance use disorder (addiction) or at any time after
 major depression with psychotic or melancholic features
 bipolar disorder
 schizophrenia or schizophrenia-related disorders
 delusional disorders
 the eating disorder bulimia nervosa
 dementia of any form
 chronic fatigue syndrome
 fatigue caused by an active medical condition
 fatigue caused by a previous medical condition that may not be fully resolved
 fatigue caused as a known side effect of  medication
 severe obesity (a body mass index greater than 45)

Common medical causes of fatigue
These must be ruled out before a diagnosis of ICF can be made.
 Infectious diseases including viruses and TB
 Vascular diseases (affecting heart and circulation)
 Toxins and drug effects including poisons and substance use (addiction)
 Diseases affecting the lungs, including chronic obstructive pulmonary disease (COPD)
 Endocrine and metabolic problems, e.g., thyroid diseases and diabetes
 Diseases involving benign or cancerous tumours, including cancer fatigue
 Psychological or psychosocial conditions, including major depression
 Anaemia, Lupus and certain autoimmune or neurological diseases
 Occupational stress or other life stress and  burnout
 Domestic violence

Management
Idiopathic chronic fatigue is typically managed in general medicine rather than by referral to a specialist. There is no cure, no approved drug, and treatment options are limited. Management may involve a form of counseling, or antidepressant medication, although some patients may prefer herbal or alternative remedies.

Counseling
A form of counseling known as cognitive behavioral therapy may help some people manage or cope with idiopathic chronic fatigue.

Medication
There are no approved drugs for ICF.

Anti-depressants
Antidepressants drugs such as tricyclic antidepressants (TCAs) or selective serotonin reuptake inhibitors (SSRIs) may be appropriate.

Alternative and complementary treatments
Only limited trials had been conducted for alternative and complementary treatments; there is no clear evidence of these treatments being effective for ICF due to a lack of randomized controlled trials.

Prognosis 
Over half of patients remain fatigued after one year.

Epidemiology
Fatigue is common in the general population and often caused by overwork, too much activity or a specific illness or disease. Around 20% of patients who visit their clinician report fatigue. Prolonged fatigue is fatigue that persists for more than a month, and chronic fatigue is fatigue that lasts at least six consecutive months.

Idiopathic chronic fatigue affects between 0.62% and 6.42% of patients, with females more likely to be affected than men. Age at onset is typically between age 15 and 24, or over 60 years of age. A significant number of patients present with idiopathic chronic fatigue as part of a mix of symptoms, while others present with a primary problem of fatigue alone.

See also 
 Fatigue
 Occupational burnout
 Chronic fatigue

References

External links 

Idiopathic diseases